Composite or compositing may refer to:

Materials
 Composite material, a material that is made from several different substances
 Metal matrix composite, composed of metal and other parts
 Cermet, a composite of ceramic and metallic materials
 Dental composite, a substance used to fill cavities in teeth
 Composite armor, a type of tank armor
 Alloy, a mixture of a metal and another element
 Mixture, the combination of several different substances without chemical reaction

Mathematics 
 Composite number, a positive integer that has at least one factor other than one or itself

Science
 Composite particle, a particle which is made up of smaller particles
 Compositae or "composite family" of flowering plants
 Composite volcano, a layered conical volcano
 Compositing, another name for superposed epoch analysis, a statistical method used to analyze time series involving multiple events

Technology
 Compositing, combining of visual elements from separate sources into single images
 Digital compositing
 Composite pattern, a software design pattern used for computer programming
 Composite video, an analogue video signal format
 Composite portrait, a compositing of images such as faces to produce an Ideal type
 Composite ship, a marine vessel with a design incorporating both wood and metal for the body
 Composite bow, in archery, made of multiple materials, in contrast to an all-wood bow
 Compositing window manager, a window manager that gives every window an off-screen buffer

Other
 Composite card, a marketing tool for actors and models
 Composite character, a character in an adaptation of a work formed from two or more characters from the original work
 Composite order, in architecture, a type of capital on a column
 Composite motion, in parliamentary procedure, created by assimilating multiple motions into one
 Facial composite, an approximate likeness of a person's face based on an eyewitness's description
 Composite (finance), a proxy for financial markets performance
 Composite coach, a railway carriage with seating for more than one class of passenger

See also
 Compound (disambiguation)